Walter Allen Calhoun (August 21, 1911 – October 2, 1976), nicknamed "Lefty", was an American Negro league pitcher in the 1930s and 1940s.

A native of Union City, Tennessee, Calhoun made his Negro leagues debut in 1932 with the Montgomery Grey Sox and Memphis Red Sox. He went on to play for several teams, and was selected to represent the St. Louis–New Orleans Stars in the 1940 East–West All-Star Game. Calhoun finished his career in 1946 with the Indianapolis Clowns. He died in Cleveland, Ohio in 1976 at age 65.

References

External links
 and Seamheads

1911 births
1976 deaths
Harrisburg Stars players
Indianapolis ABCs (1938) players
Indianapolis Clowns players
Memphis Red Sox players
Montgomery Grey Sox players
St. Louis–New Orleans Stars players
New York Black Yankees players
Philadelphia Stars players
St. Louis Stars (1939) players
Baseball pitchers
Baseball players from Tennessee
People from Union City, Tennessee
20th-century African-American sportspeople